MultiAir or Multiair is a hydraulically-actuated variable valve timing and variable valve lift engine technology enabling "cylinder by cylinder, stroke by stroke" control of intake air directly via a gasoline engine's inlet valves. Developed by Fiat Powertrain Technologies, the technology bypasses a primary engine inefficiency: pumping losses caused by restriction of the intake passage by the throttle plate, used to regulate air feeding the cylinders.         

Fiat S.p.A., now Stellantis, launched MultiAir in 2009 employing a proprietary electro-hydraulic system to precisely control air intake without a throttle valve, in order to increase engine power and torque, reduce fuel consumption, reduce emissions, and improve engine operation, offering "a more controllable flow of air during the combustion cycle in comparison with mechanical VVT systems." The technology allows engines to be lighter and smaller while reducing pumping losses and can be adapted to existing engines by replacing the camshaft with the MultiAir system, thus requiring a new head only.

MultiAir was licensed to the Schaeffler Group in 2011, which also markets the system as Uniair. Schaeffler began supplying Uniair systems in 2017 to Jaguar Land Rover, branded as Ingenium technology.

Compatible with both naturally aspirated and forced-induction engines, MultiAir technology was patented by Fiat in 2002 and was launched at the 2009 Geneva Motor Show in the Alfa Romeo MiTo.  Launched in Fiat's FIRE 1.4 units, e.g., in the Fiat 500 (2007), 1.4 MultiAir engines for global markets are manufactured in Termoli, Italy at the Fiat Powertrain Technologies factory and at the FCA's Dundee Engine Plant (formerly of Global Engine Alliance's GEMA manufacturing branch), with critical systems manufactured and assembled by Schaeffler Group. 

In 2010, the 1.4L MultiAir engine won the International Engine of the Year as well as Popular Science's Best of What's New. In the same year, the Fiat SGE engine (0.9 turbocharged and 1.0 naturally aspirated TwinAir units), also using MultiAir technology, was launched in the Fiat 500. It is produced in Bielsko-Biała, Poland. It was named Best New Engine of 2011.

Both FIRE and SGE units equipped with MultiAir use indirect fuel injection.

MultiAir II, using direct fuel injection, was made available in the GME (Hurricane) and GSE (FireFly) units, starting from 2016.

Technology

For variable valve timing, competing technologies (e.g., Honda's VTEC and BMW's VANOS) use electromechanical concepts, achieving valve lift variation via dedicated mechanisms, usually combined with camshaft phasers to allow control of both valve lift and phase. In contrast, MultiAir uses managed hydraulic fluid to provide variable valve control.

Control of a MultiAir engine's intake valves works via a valve tappet (cam follower), moved by a mechanical intake cam, which is connected to the intake
valve through a hydraulic chamber, controlled by a normally open on/off solenoid valve.
The system allows optimum timing of intake valve operation.

MultiAir technology can increase power (up to 10%) and torque (up to 15%), as well as reduce consumption levels (up to 10%) and emissions of CO2 (up to 10%), particulates (up to 40%) and NOx (up to 60%) when compared to a traditional petrol engine. The system also provides smoother cold weather operation, more even torque delivery and no engine shake at shut-off.

An example of the gains offered by the MultiAir technology can be seen in the current Alfa Romeo MiTo: the 1.4 TB engine, without MultiAir, can produce  and  whilst using .

Development
Research on critical related technologies started in the 1980s, when engine electronic control reached market maturity. MultiAir was developed over a ten-year period at Fiat's Centro Ricerche Fiat (CRF) in Orbassano outside Turin, after a five year delay during Fiat's 2000-2005 partnership with General Motors.
The vice president of Fiat Powertrain Research & Development Rinaldo Rinolfi led the team who developed the technology at a cost of over $100 million.

Other systems
More advanced, fully camless valvetrain systems are under development, but are not yet production-ready. The Valvetronic system used by BMW allows the valve timing and lift to be varied, but not the cam profile. The ability to vary the latter is characteristic of camless and the MultiAir systems.

Applications
Fiat FIRE engine
Fiat SGE (TwinAir) engine
Fiat GSE (FireFly) engine
Fiat GME (Hurricane) engine
Chrysler Tigershark engine

See also
Camless
Variable valve timing

References

External links
Official Fiat Powertrain website
How it works video in Youtube

Variable valve timing
Fiat